Wanna Buy a Monkey? is a compilation album by Dan the Automator. It was released on Sequence Records in 2002. It peaked at number 42 on the Billboard Heatseekers Albums chart, as well as number 28 on the Independent Albums chart. The album's title derives from a line in the film Cabin Boy.

Critical reception

At Metacritic, which assigns a weighted average score out of 100 to reviews from mainstream critics, the album received an average score of 72, based on 10 reviews, indicating "generally favorable reviews".

John Bush of AllMusic gave the album 4.5 out of 5 stars, stating that "Wanna Buy a Monkey? doesn't just collect a few of his rarer credits, but fits them into one of the best mix albums of the year." Rob Mitchum of Pitchfork gave the album a 4.0 out of 10, writing: "Part of the problem lies in the musically segregated organization of the album, as the Automator's hip-hop selections are clumped into the front and back, while the indie-friendly picks comprise the creamy center."

Track listing

Charts

References

External links
 

2002 compilation albums
Dan the Automator albums
Compilation albums by American artists